Smoke-developed index (abbreviated SDI) is a measure of the concentration of smoke a material emits as it burns. Like the Flame Spread Index, it is based on an arbitrary scale in which asbestos-cement board has a value of 0, and red oak wood has 100. The SDI is measured using a horizontal test specimen, according to the Steiner tunnel test protocol. 

The ASTM standard E84 defines a standard test method for surface flame spread and smoke density measurements. A smoke-developed index of less than 450 is required by IBC section 803.1 at interior walls and ceilings for all surface materials except trim.

See also
Steiner tunnel test
Limiting oxygen index

References

Fire test standards